The 2021 BoyleSports World Grand Prix was a darts tournament and the 24th staging of the World Grand Prix. It was held from 3–9 October 2021 at the Morningside Arena in Leicester, England. Due to the COVID-19 pandemic, the tournament was held away from the Citywest Hotel in Dublin for the second consecutive year.

Gerwyn Price was the defending champion, after defeating Dirk van Duijvenbode 5–2 in the 2020 final, but lost 5–1 to Jonny Clayton in the first all-Welsh major ranking final in PDC history. This was also Clayton's first PDC ranking major title win, as his previous three wins (the 2020 PDC World Cup of Darts (alongside Price), the 2021 Masters and the 2021 Premier League Darts) were all in non-ranking events.

Prize money
The prize fund will remain at £450,000, with the winner's earnings being £110,000.

The following is the breakdown of the fund:

Qualification
The field of 32 players consists of the top 16 on the PDC Order of Merit and the top 16 non-qualified players from the ProTour Order of Merit as of 26 September 2021. Only the top eight players on the Order of Merit are seeded for the tournament.

The following players have qualified for the tournament:

PDC Order of Merit (1–16) (Top 8 Seeded)
  (runner-up)
  (first round)
  (first round)
  (second round)
  (first round)
  (first round)
  (second round)
  (quarter-finals)
  (first round)
  (first round)
  (second round)
   (quarter-finals)
  (first round)
  (champion)
  (first round)
  (semi-finals)

PDC ProTour Qualifiers
  (first round)
  (first round)
  (first round)
  (second round)
  (quarter-finals)
  (semi-finals)
  (second round)
  (first round)
  (first round)
  (second round)
  (first round)
  (first round)
  (quarter-finals)
  (first round)
  (second round)
  (second round)

Schedule

Draw

Representation
This table shows the number of players by country in the 2021 World Grand Prix. A total of 12 nationalities are represented.

References

External links
Tournament website

World Grand Prix (darts)
World Grand Prix
World Grand Prix (darts)
World Grand Prix